Tamba mnionomera is a noctuoid moth of the family Erebidae first described by George Hampson in 1926.

Characteristics
This is one of the similar species, with a longitudinal dark streak on the forewing that meets the margin at its angle. T. mnionomera has a weaker streak, more lunulate fasciation, and greenish markings, particularly a spot in the center of the hindwing just distal to the postmedial.

Distribution and habitat
It is found in Thailand and Sundaland. The species is frequent in the lowlands, found in a range of forest types and in disturbed habitats.

References

Erebidae
Boletobiinae
Moths of Borneo
Moths described in 1926